4358 Lynn, provisional designation , is a stony Eunomia asteroid from the central region of the asteroid belt, approximately 10 kilometers in diameter. It was discovered by British astronomer Philip Herbert Cowell at the Royal Greenwich Observatory on 5 October 1909. It was named for William Lynn, an assistant astronomer at the discovering observatory.

Orbit and classification 

Lynn is a member of the Eunomia family, a large group of stony asteroids and the most prominent family in the intermediate main-belt. It orbits the Sun in the central main-belt at a distance of 2.2–3.1 AU once every 4 years and 3 months (1,538 days). Its orbit has an eccentricity of 0.17 and an inclination of 13° with respect to the ecliptic. No precoveries or identifications were made prior to its discovery, and the asteroid's observation arc begins in 1909.

Physical characteristics

Diameter and albedo 

According to the survey carried out by NASA's Wide-field Infrared Survey Explorer with its subsequent NEOWISE mission, Lynn measures 9.1 kilometers in diameter and its surface has a high albedo of 0.307. The Collaborative Asteroid Lightcurve Link assumes a standard albedo for members of the Eunomia family of 0.21 and calculates a diameter of 10.5 kilometers with an absolute magnitude of 12.2.

Lightcurve 

In April 2009, a rotational lightcurve of Lynn was obtained from photometric observations made at the Oakley Southern Sky Observatory in Australia. Lightcurve analysis gave a well-defined rotation period of  hours with a brightness variation of 0.60 in magnitude.

Naming 

This minor planet is named for William Thynne Lynn (1835–1911), who worked for many years as an assistant at the Royal Greenwich Observatory during the second half of the 19th century. He was also an author of various well received books and many short notes on astronomical topics, which were printed in The Observatory. It was named by the Minor Planet Names Committee after a proposal by Brian G. Marsden. The approved naming citation was published by the Minor Planet Center on 1 September 1993.

References

External links 
 Asteroid Lightcurve Database (LCDB), query form (info )
 Dictionary of Minor Planet Names, Google books
 Asteroids and comets rotation curves, CdR – Observatoire de Genève, Raoul Behrend
 Discovery Circumstances: Numbered Minor Planets (1)-(5000) – Minor Planet Center
 
 

 

004358
Named minor planets
19091005